Hypomecis lioptilaria is a species from the genus Hypomecis. The species was originally described by Charles Swinhoe in 1901

References

Taxa named by Charles Swinhoe
Boarmiini
Insects described in 1901